National Route 25 or Highway 25 is a 180,810 kilometer long Vietnamese highway linking Phu Yen on the South Central coast to Gia Lai in the Central Highland. National Route 25 begins at the Hoa An commune, Phu Hoa district of Phu Yen province and ends at Chu Se town, Chu Se district of Gia Lai province.

Highway 25 intersects with National Route 14.

References 

National routes in Vietnam